The November 2009 nor'easter (also referred to as "Nor'Ida") was a powerful autumn nor'easter that caused widespread damage throughout the east coast of the United States.  This extratropical cyclone formed in relation to  Hurricane Ida's remnant mid-level circulation across southeastern Georgia and moved east-northeast offshore North Carolina, before slowly dropping south and southeast over the succeeding several days. The system eventually dissipated on November 17.

Synoptic history

The origins of the nor'easter originated from with the remnants of Hurricane Ida, a storm that formed on November 4 over the southern Caribbean Sea. After tracking through Nicaragua as a Category 1 hurricane, the system attained Category 2 status over the Yucatán Channel. Once in the Gulf of Mexico, the combination of increasing wind shear and cooler waters caused Ida to weaken. The system eventually moved over the southeastern United States on November 10 before transitioning into an extratropical cyclone. Ida's remnant low later dissipated over the Florida Panhandle on November 11. However, Ida's mid-level circulation led to the formation of a new low over southeastern Georgia, which eventually moved off the coast of North Carolina. This new low quickly intensified and became a powerful nor'easter that caused substantial damage throughout the Mid-Atlantic States. Due to the rapid succession of these systems, United States media referred to the nor'easter as "Nor'Ida". In combination with a large area of high pressure, a long stretch of easterly, onshore winds impacted areas from Virginia to southern New England. Tracking parallel to the North Carolina coastline, the system eventually moved onshore near Cape Hatteras by November 13. Due to the high-pressure system situated over Vermont, the low turned southeastward, bringing its center back over water. Gradual weakening took place during this period, though heavy rains continued to fall across much of the Chesapeake Bay area. On November 14, a brief secondary low developed within the system, off the coast of Delaware. Continuing to weaken, the cyclone resumed a northward track after the high weakened and persisted through November 17, by which time it had moved over Atlantic Canada.

Preparations

As the remnants of Ida began to weaken within the developing nor'easter on November 11, flood warnings were already in force from Alabama to Georgia and watches extended northward into the Mid-Atlantic states. Coastal flood watches and high wind warnings were also in effect from North Carolina to Delaware. Flood warnings were later expanded into South Carolina and coastal advisories were extended to New Jersey and Long Island. Gale warnings continued to grow in coverage, encompassing areas from North Carolina to New Jersey by the afternoon of November 12. By November 13, the watches and warnings gradually began to be discontinued as the low moved offshore. Although the Hydrometeorological Prediction Center issued their final advisory on the system later on November 13, flood advisories remained in effect due to residual impacts from the cyclone.

Impact

Storm surge
Due to the location of the storm, south east of the Chesapeake Bay, persistent onshore flows brought elevated water levels to some areas for up to four days. This also brought a storm surge to much of the region and in some cases, these surges reached record levels set by Hurricane Isabel in 2003. Five coastal measuring stations recorded record-high water levels during the event and three were within . Despite the nor'easter not being nearly as intense as Hurricane Isabel, water levels rivaled that of the hurricane because of persistent onshore flows, elevating water levels for several days.

Southeastern states

Along the east coast of the United States, a nor'easter spawned by the remnants of Ida resulted in widespread damage along coastal areas. One person was killed after his vehicle collided with a downed tree in. Flash flooding took place in some areas due to the heavy rains and previously saturated grounds. In North Carolina strong winds downed several trees loosened in saturated soil. In Rockingham County, one person was killed after being struck by a branch while driving. In the Outer Banks, four homes were destroyed and over 500 others were damaged by the system, leaving at least $5.8 million in losses.

Mid-Atlantic and Northeast
Along the Delmarva Peninsula, waves up to  caused some coastal damage and high winds left roughly 13,000 without power. In Delaware alone, damage was estimated at $45 million. The most severe damage took place in New Jersey where coastal losses were estimated to be at least $180 million. Extensive sand loss was reported at numerous beaches, including 7 million cubic yards in Ocean City alone. In New York, one person drowned after being caught in rough seas off Rockaway Beach. Total beach losses in the state reached $8.2 million. Further north, the remnants of the cyclone brought heavy rains to portions of New England, resulting in flash flooding.

Virginia
Widespread coastal damage and major flooding took place in Virginia as rainfall exceeding  fell in many places and large waves affected beaches. A maximum rainfall of  fell in Hampton during the storm. In some areas, roads were closed multiple times due to flooding. Some areas reported a storm surge comparable to that of Hurricanes Gloria in 1985 and Isabel in 2003. Damage from the storm in Virginia was estimated to be at least $38.8 million, of which $25 million was in Norfolk alone. According to the National Weather Service,  of rain fell in Norfolk between November 11 and 13, nearly three times the monthly average for November; in those three days alone, the total rainfall surpassed the monthly record of  set in 1951. Hurricane-force winds also affected the state, with a peak gust of  occurring in Oceana.

Aftermath
Following the widespread flooding caused by the storm, a major disaster declaration was signed by President Barack Obama on December 9 to provide residents in Virginia with federal assistance. According to the Federal Emergency Management Agency (FEMA), the cost of federal public assistance in the state would reach $11,227,376.

See also

October 2009 North American storm complex: Formed from the remnant circulation associated with Typhoon Melor, in a similar manner
Winter storms of 2009–2010
November 2006 nor'easter
2009 Atlantic hurricane season

References

External links

Oblique aerial photography and video of post-storm damage from the nor'easter (KMZ)

2009 meteorology
Nor'easters
2009 natural disasters in the United States